The Focke-Wulf Fw 57 was a prototype German heavy fighter and fighter-bomber. Prototypes were built in 1936 but never entered production.

Design and development
In 1934, the Reich Air Ministry (RLM) declared a requirement for a Kampfzerstörer (battle destroyer), a tactical multi-role fighter/bomber concept, and a possible predecessor to the late-1930s German Schnellbomber concept. Focke-Wulf submitted the Fw 57, Messerschmitt submitted the Bf 110 and Henschel submitted the Hs 124.  The Fw 57 was larger than its two competitors; it was heavier and did not handle as well as them.

The Fw 57 was a twin-engine all-metal monoplane of conventional configuration, with a single fin and rearwards-retracting maingear members comprising its tailwheel undercarriage, into the engine nacelles. The pilot and navigator sat in tandem under a long canopy, the aft end of which had a gunner's turret.

Three Fw 57 prototypes (V1-V3) were completed during 1936. The aircraft was severely overweight and handled poorly. The original Kampfzerstörer concept, which specified a multi-role aircraft with turret-mounted armament had been abandoned by autumn 1936 in favor of the simpler Zerstörer represented by the Bf 110, which omitted gun turrets and bombing capability to allow greater performance. All further research into the Fw 57 was abandoned shortly thereafter.

Specifications (Fw 57 V1)

References

Green, William. Warplanes of the Third Reich. New York:Doubleday, 1972. .
Green, William and Gordon Swanborough. The Complete Book of Fighters. New York, Smithmark, 1994. .
Herwig, D and H. Rode.Luftwaffe Secret Projects - Ground Attack & Special Purpose Aircraft. 
Wagner, Ray and Heinz Nowarra. German Combat Planes: A Comprehensive Survey and History of the Development of German Military Aircraft from 1914 to 1945. New York: Doubleday, 1971.

External links

Picture and specifications of Fw 57

Abandoned military aircraft projects of Germany
Fw 057
Focke-Wulf Fw 057
Low-wing aircraft
Aircraft first flown in 1936
Twin piston-engined tractor aircraft